Grace Burgess may refer to:

Grace Burgess, character in Peaky Blinders (TV series)
Grace Burgess, character in The Lusty Men